The Sunday Times University of the Year is an annual award given to a British university or other higher education institution by The Sunday Times. The current University of the Year for 2023 is the University of Bath.

The award is given as part of the annual Times and Sunday Times University Guide since the second supplement's second edition in 1999. Though the guide contains a league table of UK universities compiled from various statistics, the award is not necessarily given to the university at the top (in fact, it only has been in 2007 and 2010). Instead, a university is chosen by a panel of experts based on all round academic excellence.  

In addition to the winner, shortlisted universities are also named. A runners-up position was introduced in 2006.

From 2009 onwards, the University Guide took the year of its name from the following year (so the guide published in 2009 is known as 2010, the guide published in 2010 is known as 2011 etc.)

Although very similar in name, this award has no connection to the "University of the Year" award given by Times Higher Education.

List of winners

Universities with multiple appearances

References

Educational awards in the United Kingdom
Awards established in 1999
1999 establishments in the United Kingdom
University of the Year
Universities in the United Kingdom
Annual events in the United Kingdom